Arthrodytes is an extinct genus of penguins which contains a single species, whose remains have been recovered from the San Julian Formation (Late Eocene to Early Oligocene) of Patagonia. Other authors report a younger age for the fossils recovered from the Early Miocene Gaiman and Monte León Formations.

Together with the related genus Paraptenodytes, they form the subfamily Paraptenodytinae, which is not ancestral to modern penguins.

References 

Extinct penguins
Bird genera
Eocene birds
Oligocene birds
Paleogene birds of South America
Miocene birds of South America
Paleogene Argentina
Neogene Argentina
Fossils of Argentina
Gaiman Formation
Fossil taxa described in 1905
Taxa named by Florentino Ameghino